Donald Hudson may refer to:

Donald Hudson (aviator) (1895–1967), World War I flying ace
Donald Foster Hudson (1916–2003), missionary
Don Hudson (1929–2018), American football player